Unión Polideportiva Plasencia is a football team based in Plasencia in the autonomous community of Extremadura. Founded in 1974 through a merger of CD Plasencia and SP Plasencia Industrial, it plays in the 3ª - Group 14. Its stadium is Ciudad Deportiva with a capacity of 5,000 seats.

History 
In the 2018-19 season the club finished 5th with 70 points in 38 games in Tercera División, Group 14.

Club background
Plasencia CF (1941–47)
CD Plasencia (1947–74)
SP Plasencia Industrial (1970–1974)
UP Plasencia (1974–)

Season to season

Plasencia CF

3 seasons in Tercera División

CD Plasencia

16 seasons in Tercera División

SP Plasencia Industrial

UP Plasencia

5 seasons in Segunda División B
35 seasons in Tercera División

References

External links
Official webpage (in Spanish)
Futbolme team profile 

Association football clubs established in 1974
1974 establishments in Spain
Football clubs in Plasencia